Chen Jianxin (born 7 September 1986) is a Chinese Para-cyclist who represented China at the 2020 Summer Paralympics.

Career
Jianxin represented China in the men's road time trial T1–2 event at the 2020 Summer Paralympics and won a gold medal. He also competed in the men's road race T1–2 event and won a gold medal.

References

Living people
1986 births
Chinese male cyclists
People from Jiangmen
Cyclists at the 2020 Summer Paralympics
Medalists at the 2020 Summer Paralympics
Paralympic medalists in cycling
Paralympic gold medalists for China
21st-century Chinese people